Ondřej Vaněk (born 25 September 1990) is a Czech football central midfielder who plays for SK Dolní Chabry. He has also played for the Czech under-21 team.

Club career
On 9 July 2016, he signed a 4-year contract with the Russian side FC Ufa. He was released from his Ufa contract by mutual consent on 16 August 2019.

On 5 September 2019, he signed with FC Zbrojovka Brno.

Career statistics

Club

Notes

References

External links
 Profile at iDNES.cz
 Profile at FC Zbrojovka Brno

1990 births
Living people
Czech footballers
Czech Republic under-21 international footballers
Czech First League players
FC Zbrojovka Brno players
FK Jablonec players
SK Slavia Prague players
FC Viktoria Plzeň players
Czech expatriate footballers
Expatriate footballers in Turkey
Czech expatriate sportspeople in Turkey
Süper Lig players
Kayserispor footballers
Czech Republic international footballers
Association football midfielders
FC Ufa players
Expatriate footballers in Russia
Russian Premier League players
Czech National Football League players
Footballers from Brno